Interfaith marriage in Judaism (also called mixed marriage or intermarriage) was historically looked upon with very strong disfavor by Jewish leaders, and it remains a controversial issue among them today. In the Talmud and all of resulting Jewish law until the advent of new Jewish movements following the Jewish Enlightenment, the "Haskala", marriage between a Jew and a gentile is both prohibited, and also void under Jewish law.

A 2013 survey conducted in the United States by the Pew Research Center’s Religion & Public Life Project found the intermarriage rate to be 58% among all Jews and 71% among non-Orthodox Jews.

Later laws and rulings
The Talmud holds that a marriage between a Jew and a non-Jew is both prohibited and also does not constitute a marriage under Jewish law. Furthermore, a Jewish man has no recognized paternal or parental relation to any offspring resulting from a relationship with a gentile woman.

Christian rulers regarded unions between Jews and Christians unfavourably, and repeatedly prohibited them under penalty of death.

Gradually, however, many countries removed these restrictions, and marriage between Jews and Christians (and Muslims) began to occur. In 1236, Moses of Coucy induced the Jews bespoused by such marriages to dissolve them. In 1807, Napoleon's Grand Sanhedrin declared that such marriages although not valid under Jewish law were civilly valid and should not be treated as anathema. In 1844, the 1807 ruling was extended by the Rabbinical Conference of Brunswick to include any adherent of a monotheistic religion, but they also altered it to forbid marriages involving those who lived in states that would prevent children of the marriage from being raised Jewish. This conference was highly controversial; one of its resolutions called on its members to abolish the Kol Nidre prayer, which opens the Yom Kippur service. One member of the Brunswick Conference later changed his opinion, becoming an opponent of intermarriage.

Traditional Judaism does not consider marriage between a Jew by birth and a convert as an intermarriage. Hence, all the Biblical passages that appear to support intermarriages, such as that of Joseph to Asenath, and that of Ruth to Boaz, were regarded by the classical rabbis as having occurred only after the foreign spouse had converted to Judaism. Some opinions, however, still considered Canaanites forbidden to marry even after conversion; this did not necessarily apply to their children. The Shulchan Aruch and its commentaries bring various opinions as to whether intermarriage is a Torah prohibition and when the prohibition is rabbinic.

A foundling – a person who was abandoned as a child without their parents being identified – was classified as a non-Jew, in relation to intermarriage, if they had been found in an area where at least one non-Jew lived (even if there were hundreds of Jews in the area, and just one non-Jew); this drastically contrasts with the treatment by other areas of Jewish religion, in which a foundling was classified as Jewish if the majority of the people were Jewish in the area in which the foundling was found. If the mother was known, but not the father, the child was treated as a foundling, unless the mother claimed that the child was an Israelite (the claim would be given the benefit of the doubt).

Marriages between Jews and "German-blooded" people were banned in Nazi Germany under the Nuremberg Laws.

Modern attitudes
The Talmud and later classical sources of Jewish law are clear that the institution of Jewish marriage, kiddushin, can only be effected between Jews.

The more liberal American Jewish movements—including Reform, Reconstructionist (collectively organized in the World Union for Progressive Judaism)—do not generally regard the historic corpus and process of Jewish law as intrinsically binding. Progressive rabbinical associations have no firm prohibition against intermarriage; according to a survey of rabbis, conducted in 1985, more than 87% of Reconstructionist rabbis were willing to officiate at interfaith marriages, and in 2003 at least 50% of Reform rabbis were willing to perform interfaith marriages. The Central Conference of American Rabbis, the Reform rabbinical association in North America and the largest Progressive rabbinical association, consistently opposed intermarriage at least until the 1980s, including their members officiating at them, through resolutions and responsa.  In 2015, the Reconstructionist Rabbinical College voted to accept rabbinical students in interfaith relationships, making Reconstructionist Judaism the first type of Judaism to officially allow rabbis in relationships with non-Jewish partners.

Humanistic Judaism is a Jewish movement that offers a nontheistic alternative in contemporary Jewish life, and defines Judaism as the cultural and historical experience of the Jewish people. The Society for Humanistic Judaism answers the question "Is intermarriage contributing to the demise of Judaism?" on its website, stating, "Intermarriage is the positive consequence of a free and open society. If the Jewish community is open, welcoming, embracing, and pluralistic, we will encourage more people to identify with the Jewish people rather than fewer. Intermarriage could contribute to the continuity of the Jewish people."

The largest Reform Synagogue in New York- Central Synagogue, performs "interfaith" marriages. Such marriages are conducted to strengthen Jewish continuity (with the aim that the non-Jewish spouse will convert to Judaism). The 2013 study by Pew Research "What happens when Jews intermarry?" found that children of intermarriage are much more likely to intermarry themselves and much more likely than people with two Jewish parents to describe themselves religiously as atheist, agnostic or just “nothing in particular.” The Study "also suggests" that an increasing percentage of the children of intermarriages are Jewish in adulthood. Among Americans age 65 and older who at the time of the survey said they had one Jewish parent, 25% were Jewish. By contrast, among adults under 30 with one Jewish parent, 59% were Jewish at the time of the survey. Therefore "in this sense, intermarriage may be transmitting Jewish identity to a growing number of Americans.". The survey qualifies that "it is snapshot in time and shows show associations, or linkages, rather than clear causal connections" and it is unknown "whether the large cohort of young adult children of intermarriage who are Jewish today will remain Jewish as they age, marry (and in some cases, intermarry), start families and move through the life cycle".

All branches of Orthodox Judaism follow the historic Jewish attitudes to intermarriage, and therefore refuse to accept that intermarriages would have any validity or legitimacy, and strictly forbid sexual intercourse with a member of a different faith. Orthodox rabbis refuse to officiate at interfaith weddings, and also try to avoid assisting them in other ways. Secular intermarriage is seen as a deliberate rejection of Judaism, and an intermarried person is effectively cut off from most of the Orthodox community, although some Chabad-Lubavitch and Modern Orthodox Jews do reach out to intermarried Jews, especially Jewish women (because Orthodox Jewish law considers the children of Jewish women to be Jews regardless of the father's status).

The Conservative Movement in Judaism does not sanction or recognize the Jewish legal validity of intermarriage, but encourages acceptance of the non-Jewish spouse within the family, hoping that such acceptance will lead to the spouse's conversion to Judaism. The Rabbinical Assembly Standards of Rabbinic Practice prohibit Conservative rabbis from officiating at intermarriages, and officially forbade Conservative rabbis from attending intermarriages until 2018. In 1995 the Leadership Council of Conservative Judaism published the following statement on intermarriage:
In the past, intermarriage... was viewed as an act of rebellion, a rejection of Judaism. Jews who intermarried were essentially excommunicated. But now, intermarriage is often the result of living in an open society... If our children end up marrying non-Jews, we should not reject them. We should continue to give our love and by that retain a measure of influence in their lives, Jewishly and otherwise. Life consists of constant growth and our adult children may yet reach a stage when Judaism has new meaning for them. However, the marriage between a Jew and non-Jew is not a celebration for the Jewish community.....

The exact definition of 'interfaith' marriage

Different movements in Judaism have different views on who is a Jew, and thus on what constitutes an interfaith marriage. Unlike Reform Judaism, the Orthodox stream does not accept as Jewish a person whose mother is not Jewish, nor a convert whose conversion was not performed according to classical Jewish law.  Conservative Judaism does not accept patrilineal descent. A small minority of Conservative rabbis will accept Reform conversions even absent traditional halachic criteria.

Occasionally, a Jew marries a non-Jew who believes in God as understood by Judaism, and who rejects non-Jewish theologies; Jews sometimes call such people Noahides. Steven Greenberg, an Orthodox Rabbi, has made the controversial proposal that, in these cases, the non-Jewish partner be considered a resident alien – the biblical description of someone who is not Jewish, but who lives within the Jewish community; according to Jewish tradition, such resident aliens share many of the same responsibilities and privileges as the Jewish community in which they reside.

Impact and consequences
In the early 19th century, in some less modernised regions of the world, exogamy was extremely rare—less than 0.1% of the Jews of Algeria, for example, practiced exogamy. In the early 20th century, even in most Germanic regions of central Europe there were still only a mere 5% of Jews marrying non-Jews. However, the picture was quite different in other locations; the figure was 18% for Berlin, and during the same period, nearly half of all Jews in Australia intermarried.

In more recent times, rates of intermarriage have increased generally; for example, the US National Jewish Population Survey 2000-01 reports that, in the United States of America between 1996 and 2001, nearly half (47%) of Jews who had married during that time period had married non-Jewish partners. The 1990 National Jewish Population Survey reported an intermarriage rate of 52 percent among American Jews. The possibility that this might lead to the gradual dying out of Judaism is regarded by most Jewish leaders, regardless of denomination, as precipitating a crisis. For this reason, as early as the mid 19th century, some senior Jewish leaders denounced intermarriage as a danger to the continued existence of Judaism.

In the United States of America, other causes, such as more people marrying later in life, have combined with intermarriage to cause the Jewish community to decrease dramatically; for every 20 adult Jews, there are now only 17 Jewish children. Some religious conservatives now even speak metaphorically of intermarriage as a silent holocaust. On the other hand, more tolerant and liberal Jews embrace interfaith marriage as an enriching contribution to a multicultural society. Regardless of attitudes to intermarriage, there is now an increasing effort to reach out to descendants of intermarried parents, each Jewish denomination focusing on those it defines as Jewish; secular and non-denominational Jewish organisations have sprung up to bring the descendants of intermarried parents back into the Jewish fold.

In some cases, children of a Jewish parent were raised in the non-Jewish parent's religion while maintaining a sense of Jewish ethnicity and identity. An example of such a child is the late Barry Goldwater, who had a Jewish father, but was a lifelong Episcopalian like his mother, though Goldwater rarely referred to himself as Jewish.

Christian–Jewish relations

In Christian–Jewish relations, interfaith marriage and the associated phenomenon of Jewish assimilation are a matter of concern for both Jewish and Christian leaders. Most mainstream Christian churches accept and may even promote the conversion of Jews. However, a number of Progressive Christian denominations have publicly declared that they will no longer adhere to this practice. These churches embrace dual-covenant theology. Additionally, Jewish counter-missionary and anti-missionary organizations like Outreach Judaism encourage Jews to reject conversion to Christianity, while Messianic Jewish organizations like Jews for Jesus actively work to encourage it.

Opposition to mixed marriages in Israel 
Most Israeli Jews oppose mixed relationships, particularly those between Jewish women and Muslim men. A 2007 opinion survey found that over half of Israeli Jews believed intermarriage is equivalent to "national treason". In 2005, Ben-Zion Gopstein, a disciple of the ultra-nationalist Meir Kahane, founded the anti-miscegenation organisation Lehava. The group's name is an acronym for “To Prevent Assimilation in the Holy Land”.  A group of Jewish "Lehava" men started patrolling the Jerusalem neighborhood of Pisgat Ze'ev in an effort to stop Jewish women from dating Arab men. The municipality of Petah Tikva has also announced an initiative to prevent interfaith relationships, providing a telephone hotline for friends and family to "inform" on Jewish girls who date Arab men as well as psychologists to provide counselling. The city of Kiryat Gat launched a school programme in schools to warn Jewish girls against dating local Bedouin men. In November 2019, Lehava leader Gopstein was indicted on charges of incitement to terrorism, violence, and racism.
Interfaith marriages and dating are extremely rare in Israel, reaching way below 0.5 of the population.

See also 
 Interfaith marriage
 Jewish views of marriage
 Association for the Protection of Mixed Families' Rights

References

External links
Chabad.org: On Intermarriage - The Basis for Jewish Opposition to Intermarriage
Supporting Interfaith Families Exploring Jewish Life

Jewish marital law
Judaism-related controversies
Jewish society
Negative Mitzvoth
Interfaith marriage